Sri Krishna (born 17 August 1983) is an Indian playback singer, born in Hyderabad and brought up in Vijayawada. He was the winner of the singing competition Paadaalani Vundi hosted by S. P. Balasubrahmanyam on Maa TV. He debuted as playback singer with the film Maa Ilavelpu, released in 2004.

Early life 

Krishna started his career as a child anchor in Akashvani, Vijayawada and then participated in various stage shows and singing competitions. He completed his bachelor's degree in P. B. Siddhartha Arts College and post graduation in Sarada college, in Vijayawada. He got recognition with the song Aadinchi Ashta Chamma from the film Ashta Chamma and recorded songs for composers like Koti and Mani Sharma.

Discography

As singer

Telugu films

Kannada films

Tamil films

Malayalam films

Hindi films

References 

Telugu playback singers
1983 births
Living people